Al-Jamiatul Arabia Lil Baneena Wal Banaat Haildhar, popularly known as the Haildhar Madrasa is the first Qawmi madrasa having Female Branch in Bangladesh. The madrasah is founded by Allama Abdul Malek Halim.

Education system

The Jamia offers education from the primary level up to highest level of Islamic education. The Jamia has the following depts of education:

 Dept of Primary Education
 Dept of Secondary Education
 Dept Higher Secondary Education
 Dept of Tafsir
 Dept of Hadith
 Dept of Fiqh
 Dept of Mantiq
 Dept of Tajweed
 Dept of Arabic and Bengali Literature

Publication

'Al-Jamiatul Arabia Lil Baneena Wal Banaat Haildhar' publishes a magazine called Deeni Biplon (Revolution). The magazine contains the lecture of Islamic scholar, poem written by the madrasah student, news regarding present Muslim World and news of the madrasah.

See also
Al-Jamiah Al-Islamiah Patiya
Jamiatul Uloom Al-Islamia Lalkhan Bazar
Al-Jamiatul Islamiah Azizul Uloom Babunagar

References

Qawmi madrasas of Bangladesh
Deobandi Islamic universities and colleges
Islamic universities and colleges in Bangladesh
1924 establishments in India